The 2013–14 LSU Lady Tigers basketball team will represent Louisiana State University during the 2013–2014 college basketball season. The team's head coach is Nikki Fargas, who is in her third season at LSU.  They play their home games at Pete Maravich Assembly Center as members of the Southeastern Conference.

Roster

Schedule and Results

|-
!colspan=12 style="background:#FDD023; color:#33297B;"| Exhibition

|-
!colspan=12 style="background:#33297B; color:#FDD023;"| Regular Season

|-
!colspan=12 style="background:#33297B;"| 2014 SEC Tournament

|-
!colspan=9 style="background:#33297B;"| 2014 NCAA Tournament

Source:

Rankings

References

See also
 2013–14 LSU Tigers basketball team

LSU Lady Tigers basketball seasons
Lsu
LSU
LSU
LSU